Kinelsky (masculine), Kinelskaya (feminine), or Kinelskoye (neuter) is the name of several rural localities in Russia:
Kinelsky, Orenburg Oblast, a settlement in Kinelsky Selsoviet of Matveyevsky District of Orenburg Oblast
Kinelsky, Samara Oblast, a settlement in Kinelsky District of Samara Oblast